The 2006 Central Michigan Chippewas football team represented Central Michigan University during the 2006 NCAA Division I FBS football season. Central Michigan competed as a member of the West Division of the Mid-American Conference (MAC). The Chippewas were led by third-year head coach Brian Kelly.

Central Michigan finished the regular season with an 8–4 record and a 7–1 record in conference play, placing first in the West Division. They qualified for the MAC Championship Game, where they defeated Ohio 31–10. Central Michigan competed in the Motor City Bowl against Middle Tennessee, which they won 31–14.

Schedule

References

Central Michigan
Central Michigan Chippewas football seasons
Mid-American Conference football champion seasons
Little Caesars Pizza Bowl champion seasons
Central Michigan Chippewas football